Nicolás Agustín Demartini (born 4 November 1999) is an Argentine professional footballer who plays as a centre-back for who currently plays for the Tigre, on loan from Temperley.

Club career
Demartini started his career with Temperley. Gastón Esmerado promoted the defender into the club's first-team squad during the 2017–18 Primera División campaign, making appearances against Newell's Old Boys, Chacarita Juniors and Patronato from February 2018 as they were relegated; his only previous experience in senior football was as an unused substitute in the Copa Argentina versus Defensa y Justicia in August 2017. In Primera B Nacional, the second tier, Demartini started and finished the opening twenty fixtures of 2018–19, while also netting his first goal during a 2–3 home defeat to Arsenal de Sarandí on 23 September 2018.

On 15 March 2021, Demartini joined Chilean Primera División club Antofagasta on a loan deal for the rest of 2021. In January 2022, he was loaned out once again, this time to Argentine Primera División club Tigre until the end of the year.

International career
In 2018, Demartini represented Argentina's U19s at the South American Games in Bolivia; as they finished fourth. A year later, Demartini was selected for the 2019 Pan American Games with the U23s in Peru. Just one appearance followed, though it occurred in the tournament's final against Honduras as Argentina won the trophy.

Career statistics
.

Honours
Argentina U23
Pan American Games: 2019

References

External links

1999 births
Living people
Argentine footballers
Argentine expatriate footballers
People from Almirante Brown Partido
Argentine people of Italian descent
Medalists at the 2019 Pan American Games
Sportspeople from Buenos Aires Province
Argentina youth international footballers
Footballers at the 2019 Pan American Games
Pan American Games gold medalists for Argentina
Pan American Games medalists in football
Association football defenders
Argentine Primera División players
Primera Nacional players
Chilean Primera División players
Club Atlético Temperley footballers
C.D. Antofagasta footballers
Club Atlético Tigre footballers
Argentine expatriate sportspeople in Chile
Expatriate footballers in Chile